Roger Anthony Walker (born 15 November 1966) is an English former professional footballer of Maltese descent who played as a winger.

Playing career
Born in Bolton, Walker began his career with Bolton Wanderers, making 12 appearances in the Football League between 1984 and 1986. Later he played for Swedish team IF Friska Viljor, before returning to England at Gillingham, where he spent a year without making a League appearance.

Walker later spent time in Switzerland, playing for FC Bern 1894, FC Baden and FC Zürich between 1991 and 1997. He also played in Malta for a number of teams including Sliema Wanderers, Hibernians and Marsaxlokk.

References

1966 births
Living people
Footballers from Bolton
English footballers
Association football wingers
Bolton Wanderers F.C. players
Friska Viljor FC players
Gillingham F.C. players
Sliema Wanderers F.C. players
FC Bern players
FC Baden players
FC Zürich players
Hibernians F.C. players
Marsaxlokk F.C. players
English Football League players